This is a list of tallest buildings in Estonia. Only habitable building are ranked, which excludes radio masts and towers, observation towers, steeples, chimneys and other tall architectural structures. For those, see List of tallest structures in Estonia.

Completed buildings

Under construction

Proposed

See also
List of tallest structures in Estonia
List of tallest buildings in the Baltic states
List of high-rise buildings and structures in Tallinn

References

External links
Emporis: Estonia
Structurae: Estonia

Estonia
Lists of buildings and structures in Estonia
Estonia